2007 Silverstone GP2 Series round was a GP2 Series motor race held on 7 and 8 July 2007 at Silverstone Circuit, United Kingdom. It was the fifth round of the 2007 GP2 Series season. The race weekend supported the 2007 British Grand Prix.

Classification

Qualifying

Feature race

Sprint race

References

Silverstone
GP2